John Augustus (1785 - June 21, 1859) was an American boot maker and penal reformer. He is credited with coining the English term "probation" and is called the "Father of Probation" in the United States because of his pioneering efforts to campaign for more lenient sentences for convicted criminals based on their backgrounds.

Life

Augustus was born in Woburn, Massachussetts. Augustus' interest in prisoner rehabilitation began in 1841, when he was touched by the case of a man arrested for public intoxication and paid his bail, moving the judge to set the man free. Thus began Augustus' practice of paying peoples' bail. Augustus' success rate could rival - and possibly surpass - the success rate of any rehabilitation program available today. His work brought him the devotion and aid of many Boston philanthropists and organizations. Augustus' success started him on an 18-year run as the first probation officer. At his death, it was noted that of the 1,946 people he helped, only four proved unworthy (for which he forfeited bail).

Augustus died on 21 June 1859 in Boston, Massachusetts.

See also
 Matthew Davenport Hill
 Alexander Maconochie (penal reformer)
 Massachusetts Probation Service

References

External links

 New York Division of Probation and Correctional Alternatives - History of Probation: Meet John Augustus
 New York City Department of Probation - Brief History of Probation

1785 births
1859 deaths
Shoemakers
People from Boston
Probation and parole officers